In enzymology, a reticuline oxidase is an enzyme that catalyzes the chemical reaction

(S)-reticuline + O2  (S)-scoulerine + H2O2

Thus, the two substrates of this enzyme are (S)-reticuline and O2, whereas its two products are (S)-scoulerine and H2O2.

This enzyme belongs to the family of oxidoreductases, specifically those acting on X-H and Y-H to form an X-Y bond with oxygen as acceptor.  The systematic name of this enzyme class is (S)-reticuline:oxygen oxidoreductase (methylene-bridge-forming). Other names in common use include BBE, berberine bridge enzyme, berberine-bridge-forming enzyme, and tetrahydroprotoberberine synthase.  This enzyme participates in alkaloid biosynthesis i.

References

 
 
 

EC 1.21.3
Enzymes of unknown structure